Rhys Thomas (born 18 September 1979) is a Welsh director and producer best known for his work on Saturday Night Live for NBC and the series Documentary Now! for IFC.

Career
Rhys Thomas became the Saturday Night Live Film Unit producer in 2005 and in 2010 began directing shorts, music videos and commercial parodies for the show. He also directed and produced the SNL opening credit sequence in 2012–2018 and the opening credits for the Saturday Night Live 40th Anniversary Special, which he also produced and won the Primetime Emmy Award for Outstanding Variety Special in 2015.  In 2015 he made his feature film debut with the film Staten Island Summer written by Colin Jost. That year he also directed John Mulaney’s Emmy nominated stand up special The Comeback Kid for Netflix.

Thomas is also a co-creator and director of the Emmy nominated IFC series, Documentary Now!. In 2016, he also produced the Adele Live in New York City concert special for NBC, for which he earned his fourth Prime Time Emmy nomination. He also produced and directed the opening credits for the talk show Late Night with Seth Meyers. In 2017, he produced and directed all six episodes of the Amazon Prime show Comrade Detective starring Channing Tatum and Joseph Gordon-Levitt. He teamed with Bill Hader again in 2018 for Pringles' first ever Super Bowl commercial.

In 2021, Thomas served as an Executive Producer and directed episodes 1, 2 and 6 of the Marvel Cinematic Universe television series Hawkeye.

Filmography

References

External links

Living people
Welsh television producers
Welsh television directors
Welsh television writers
Primetime Emmy Award winners
Welsh film directors
1979 births
Comedy film directors